This is a list of films which placed number one at the weekend box office for the year 2017 in Thailand.

References

Thailand
2017 in Thailand
2017